The Hamilton-Tolliver complex is a historic district in Union County, Tennessee, that is listed on the National Register of Historic Places.

It is centered on a log residence built some time around the 1830s. Other structures in the historic district include a store, the remains of a tomato cannery, a smokehouse, and a privy. The store and cannery included in the complex represent the ways that farmers in the area earned their livelihoods through a combination of farming and commercial business activities.

References

Buildings and structures in Union County, Tennessee
Historic districts on the National Register of Historic Places in Tennessee
National Register of Historic Places in Union County, Tennessee